LaSalle Township is located in LaSalle County, Illinois. As of the 2010 census, its population was 13,565 and it contained 6,356 housing units. LaSalle Township was formed from Peru Township on an unknown date.

Climate

Geography

Demographics

References

External links
US Census
City-data.com
Illinois State Archives

Townships in LaSalle County, Illinois
Townships in Illinois